Bugat is a sum (district) of Govi-Altai Province in western Mongolia. In 2009, its population was 2,257.

Bugat was the birthplace of Puntsagiin Jasrai, Prime Minister of Mongolia from 1992 to 1996.

References 

Populated places in Mongolia
Districts of Govi-Altai Province